The Dir Scouts is a paramilitary regiment forming part of the Pakistani Frontier Corps Khyber Pakhtunkhwa (North) in Pakistan. The name alludes to the former Dir District in Khyber Pakhtunkhwa province.

The Scouts are tasked with defending the border with Afghanistan and assisting with law enforcement in the areas adjacent to the border. This has also included providing security during provincial assembly elections. Previously, the Scouts also assisted with attempts to eradicate poppy cultivation.

During the 2022 Pakistan floods, the regiment assisted with rescue work and disaster relief, such as operating an emergency control centre.

Units
 Headquarters Wing
 181 Wing
 182 Wing
 183 Wing
 184 Wing
 185 Wing
 186 Wing

References

Regiments of the Frontier Corps
Dir District
Frontier Corps Khyber Pakhtunkhwa (North)